Vaudesson is a commune in the Aisne department in Hauts-de-France in northern France.

Geography
The river Ailette forms all of the commune's northern border.

Population

See also
Communes of the Aisne department

References

Communes of Aisne
Aisne communes articles needing translation from French Wikipedia